St. Louis–San Francisco Railway (reporting mark SLSF, also known as the "Frisco") locomotive 4500 is a 4-8-4 Northern type steam engine.

History
No. 4500 was built as an oil-burning steam locomotive by Baldwin in 1942 for Frisco passenger service. It was the first 4-8-4 Northern that Frisco ordered.  Along with similar locomotives 4501 and 4502, it was painted in the zephyr blue, white and gray paint scheme with "Meteor" spelled out on the side of the tender in bold, red letters. It was used for pulling Frisco's crack Meteor train service.  No. 4500 even saw service pulling Frisco's Texas Special.  When the Meteor was dieselized, No. 4500 was re-painted into Frisco's standard black with gold striping and lettering, and assigned to passenger trains such as the Will Rogers.

Specifications
While the Frisco 4500-series 4-8-4s designed to be coal-burning weighed 474,070 lbs (Nos. 4503-4514) and 479,300 lbs (Nos. 4515-4524), oil-burning models like Numbers 4500 to 4502 weighed 464,850 lbs. But the whole series had 74" drivers, 28 x 31 cylinders, a boiler pressure of 250 psi, and a tractive effort of 71,200 pounds.

Preservation
No. 4500 was repainted back into the Meteor paint scheme and is on static display for free public viewing at the Route 66 Historical Village at 3770 Southwest Blvd. in Tulsa, Oklahoma.

References

 Class 4500 specs

External links
 Route 66 Historical Village website

4500
4-8-4 locomotives
Baldwin locomotives
Individual locomotives of the United States
Passenger locomotives
Standard gauge locomotives of the United States
Railway locomotives introduced in 1942

Preserved steam locomotives of Oklahoma